Hinaga Station is the name of two train stations in Japan:

 Hinaga Station (Aichi) (日長駅)
 Hinaga Station (Mie) (日永駅)